Events in 2022 in anime.

Releases

Films
A list of anime films that were released in theaters between January 1 and December 31, 2022.

Television series
A list of anime television series that debuted between January 1 and December 31, 2022.

Original net animations
A list of original net animations that debuted between January 1 and December 31, 2022.

Original video animations
A list of original video animations that debuted between January 1 and December 31, 2022.

Deaths

January
 January 10: Shinji Mizushima, Japanese manga artist (Dokaben), dies from pneumonia at age 82.

February
 February 6: Saki Nitta, Japanese voice actress (voice of Pakuri in Kill la Kill, Bridget Faye and Cache Dop in D.Gray-man Hallow), dies from meningioma at age 31.
 February 8: Toshiya Ueda, Japanese voice actor (voice of Titicaca in The Adventures of Pepero, Futon in Rascal the Raccoon, Nefertari Cobra in One Piece, Vilk in The Promised Neverland), dies at age 88.
 February 12: Manabu Ôhashi, Japanese animator (Toei Animation, TMS Entertainment, Madhouse, Tomorrow's Joe, Robot Carnival, Venus Wars, Roujin Z, Junkers Come Here, Legend of Crystania, Jungle Emperor Leo, A Tree of Palme, Black Jack, Children Who Chase Lost Voices, Patema Inverted, Bodacious Space Pirates: Abyss of Hyperspace, Harmony), art director, writer and director (Robot Carnival), dies at age 73.
 February 28: 
 Kirk Baily, American actor (voice of Millions Knives in Trigun, Shin in Cowboy Bebop, Tetsuya in Fushigi Yugi, Garma Zabi in Mobile Suit Gundam: The Movie Trilogy), dies from lung cancer at age 59.
 Norihiro Inoue, Japanese voice actor (voice of Schneizel el Britannia in Code Geass, Taichi Hiraga Keaton in Master Keaton, Marco in Gunslinger Girl, Atlas in Metropolis), dies from esophageal cancer at 63.

March
March 5: Taro Shigaki, Japanese actor (voice of Andre in The Rose of Versailles, the Prince in Hans Christian Andersen's The Little Mermaid, Siegfried in Swan Lake, Franz in Nutcracker Fantasy, Saki Vashtar in Area 88, Soldier Blue in Toward the Terra), dies from heart failure at age 70.
March 7: Mia Ikumi, Japanese manga artist (Tokyo Mew Mew), dies from subarachnoid hemorrhage at age 42.

April 
 April 7: Fujiko A. Fujio, Japanese manga artist (Doraemon, Ninja Hattori-kun, Obake no Q-Tarō, The Monster Kid and The Laughing Salesman), dies at age 88.
 April 8: Minori Matsushima, Japanese voice actress (voice of Dororo in Dororo, Sayaka Yumi in Mazinger Z, Hiroshi Ichikawa in The Monster Kid, Candice White Adley in Candy Candy, Alexandria Meat in Kinnikuman, Tsuru in One Piece), dies from pancreatic cancer at age 81.

June
 June 4: Jim White, American voice actor (voice of Haredas in One Piece, the Narrator and Igneel in Fairy Tail, Marco in Fairy Gone, Zeke's Grandpa in Attack on Titan), dies from lung cancer at age 73.
 June 8: Kousuke Takeuchi, Japanese voice actor (voice of Hikaru Amane in The Prince of Tennis, Shuun Kakei and Harao Kiminari in Eyeshield 21, Tesshin in Ginga Densetsu Weed, Dragon Ryu in Duel Masters Victory, Mitsuo Mishima in Between the Sky and Sea), dies at age 45.
 June 9: Billy Kametz, American voice actor (voice of Josuke Higashikata in JoJo's Bizarre Adventure, Anai in Aggretsuko, Naofumi Iwatani in The Rising of the Shield Hero, Mikhail in Sirius the Jaeger, White Blood Cell in Cells at Work!, Ren and Ash's Rotom Phone in Pokémon Journeys: The Series, Shigeru Aoba in Neon Genesis Evangelion), dies from colon cancer at age 35.
 June 11: Kumiko Takizawa, Japanese voice actress (voice of Grandis in Nadia: The Secret of Blue Water, Kate Hathaway and Lucina Pressette in Ginga Hyōryū Vifam, Shaya Thoov in The Super Dimension Century Orguss, Madoka Nagasaki in Miss Machiko, Panther Zora in New Cutie Honey, Naoko in Nabari no Ou), dies from a heart attack at age 69.
 June 23: Chumei Watanabe, Japanese composer (Mazinger Z, Godannar, Getter Robo Go, Transformers: Victory), dies from heart failure at age 96.
 June 27: Yuki Katsuragi, Japanese singer (performed an insert song in Space Dandy and the theme songs for Goku Midnight Eye and Gon, the Little Fox), dies from peritoneal cancer at age 73.

July
 July 4: Kazuki Takahashi, Japanese manga artist and game creator (creator of Yu-Gi-Oh!), drowns at age 60.
 July 6: James Caan, American actor (voice of the Bamboo Cutter in The Tale of the Princess Kaguya), dies at age 82.
 July 23: DUBU, Korean manwha artist (Solo Leveling), dies from cerebral hemorrhage from chronic illness.
 July 30: 
 Pat Carroll, American actress (voice of Granny in the Disney dub of My Neighbor Totoro), dies at age 95.
 Kiyoshi Kobayashi, Japanese voice actor (voice of Daisuke Jigen in Lupin the Third franchise, Bem in Humanoid Monster Bem, Adrian Rubinsky in Legend of the Galactic Heroes (OVA), Mohammed Avdol in JoJo's Bizarre Adventure (OVA), Watari in Death Note), dies from pneumonia at age 89.

August
 August 1: Hiroshi Ōtake, Japanese voice actor (voice of Koike in Obake no Q-Tarō, 004 in Cyborg 009, Sanpei in Speed Racer, Parman No. 2 in Perman, Boss in Mazinger Z, and King Nikochan in Dr. Slump), dies from acute heart failure at age 90.
 August 7: Yoshifumi Ushima, Japanese singer-songwriter (performed an insert song in H2 and the theme songs of H2 and Mobile Fighter G Gundam), dies from chronic liver cirrhosis at age 55.
 August 17: Motomu Kiyokawa, Japanese voice actor (voice of Kozo Fuyutsuki in Neon Genesis Evangelion and Rebuild of Evangelion, Walter C. Dornez in Hellsing, Tem Ray in Mobile Suit Gundam, Tippy in Is the Order a Rabbit?, Artorius in Restaurant to Another World), dies from pneumonia at age 87.
 August 25: Shichirō Kobayashi, Japanese animation art director (Tomorrow's Joe 2, The Castle of Cagliostro, Urusei Yatsura: Beautiful Dreamer, Nodame Cantabile, Ganso Tensai Bakabon), dies from congestive heart failure at age 89.

September
September 5: Shizuru Otaka, Japanese singer (performed theme songs for Hotarubi no Mori e and I'm Gonna Be An Angel!, and an insert song in .hack//Legend of the Twilight), dies from an illness at age 69.
September 12: Ryūji Mizuno, Japanese voice actor (voice of Giichi in Naruto, Meme Midgard in Turn A Gundam, B'T Radio in B't X, Master in  Zombie Land Saga Revenge, and Julius in Berserk), dies from sepsis at age 70.

October
October 5: Shinsuke Chikaishi, Japanese voice actor (voice of Masuo Fuguta in Sazae-san, Pukko in The Amazing 3, Yoshihiko Hasegawa in Roujin Z) and narrator (Gokū no Daibōken), dies from dementia at age 91.
October 11: Angela Lansbury, Irish-English actress and singer (voice of Mommy Fortuna in The Last Unicorn), dies at age 96.
October 23: Michael Kopsa, Canadian voice actor (voice of Char Aznable in Mobile Suit Gundam, Col. Volcott O. Huey in Galaxy Angel, Aeolia Schenberg in Mobile Suit Gundam 00, Ovan in .hack//Roots, Shoka Hong in The Story of Saiunkoku), dies at age 66.

November
November 8: William Frederick Knight, American voice actor (voice of Daisuke Aramaki in the Ghost in the Shell franchise, Danzo in Naruto: Shippuden, Gordon Rosewater in The Big O, Kuzemi in Eureka Seven, Dr. Schtalubaugh in El-Hazard, Kenzou in JoJo's Bizarre Adventure: Stone Ocean), dies at age 88.
November 11: Kevin Conroy, American voice actor (voice of Batman in Batman: Gotham Knight), dies from cancer at age 66.
November 12: Kazuki Ōmori, Japanese film director (The Boy Who Saw the Wind), dies from acute myeloid leukemia at age 70.
November 14: Kiyoyuki Yanada, Japanese voice actor (voice of Takenori Akagi in Slam Dunk, Shuten Doji in Ronin Warriors, Megatron in Transformers: Armada, Shu Aozaki in Durarara!!×2, Andromon in Digimon Adventure, Takeshi Ooi in Death Note), dies at age 57.
November 20: Tōru Watanabe, Japanese actor (voice of Aesop in Aesop World, a teacher in Children of the Sea), dies from either bacterial gastroenteritis or septicemia at age 61.
November 23: Grant James, American voice actor (voice of Zeff in One Piece, Scar's Master in Fullmetal Alchemist: Brotherhood, Tokio in Hal, Mujika in  Mushishi, Sirius in Nabari no Ou, Number Zero in 009-1), dies at age 87.

December
December 6: Ichirou Mizuki, Japanese singer and co-founder of JAM Project (performed theme songs for the Mazinger franchise, Space Pirate Captain Harlock, Voltes V, Chōdenji Robo Combattler V, Godannar, Beast King GoLion), dies from lung cancer at age 74.
December 12: Gosaku Ota, Japanese manga creator (Mazinger Z, Grendizer, Groizer X), dies from pneumonia at age 74.
December 25: Yuji Nunokawa, Japanese animator, animation director (The Funny Judo Champion, Casshan, Time Bokan, Creamy Mami, the Magic Angel, Osomatsu-kun, Magical Fairy Persia, Saber Rider and the Star Sheriffs) and founder of Studio Pierrot (Naruto, Bleach, Yu Yu Hakusho), dies at age 75.

References

External links 
Japanese animated works of the year, listed in the IMDb

Years in anime
anime
anime